EII may refer to:

People 
 Edward II of England (1284–1327)
 Elizabeth II (1926–2022), Queen of the United Kingdom and the other Commonwealth realms

Other uses 
 Earth Island Institute, an American environmental group
 Edward II (band), English fusion band
 Egegik Airport, in Alaska, United States
 Enterprise information integration
 Ethical Intuitive Introvert, a sociotype
 European Intervention Initiative

See also 
 E2 (disambiguation), including a list of topics named E.II